Kasindi–Beni–Butembo Road, is a road in the Democratic Republic of the Congo, connecting the towns of Kasindi, Beni and Butembo. The road allows interconnection between Uganda and DR Congo, facilitating trade, human interaction and enhancing joint security across the common border.

Location
The eastern end of this road is in the town of Kasindi, DRC,  adjacent to the town of Mpondwe, Uganda, at the international border between the two countries.

Overview
This road is an important transport corridor between Uganda and the Democratic Republics of the Congo. It is expected to boost Uganda's trade with DRC, in agricultural and manufactured products, including refined petroleum products, as Uganda enters the oil-production phase. Uganda sells cement, sugar, electricity and beverages to DRC. DRC, in exchange sells timber, kitenge and gold to Uganda.

Upgrades and reconstruction
Before 2019, the road was gravel surfaced, in various stages of disrepair. In November 2019, Yoweri Museveni of Uganda and Félix Tshisekedi of the Democratic Republic of the Congo signed agreements in Entebbe, Uganda, to upgrade this road to bituminous surface, within twenty-four months, after the relevant ministers have agreed on implementation details.

The government of the DRC would be responsible for the remaining 80 percent of the cost. The two roads involved are: 1. the  Kasindi–Beni–Butembo Road and 2. the  Bunagana–Rutshuru–Goma Road.

The total cost of improving and upgrading the two roads is budgeted at US$334.3 million. It is expected that after the road improvements, Uganda's exports to DR Congo will double, from the current $532 million (USh1.96 trillion) annually to $1.064 billion (USh3.92 trillion).

In May 2021, the Deputy Prime Minister of DRC visited Uganda to sign a key infrastructure agreement with the Ugandan authorities, 
involving this road.

In March 2022, commencement of the improvement of this road was jointly commissioned by Major General Kayanja Muhanga of the Uganda People's Defence Force (UPDF) and Major General Bombelle Camille Ehola  of the Armed Forces of the Democratic Republic of the Congo (FADRC).

Associated infrastructure
It is expected that work on this group of roads will start after completion of the first group.

See also
 List of roads in the Democratic Republic of the Congo
 List of roads in Uganda

References

External links
 Uganda and DR Congo to build cross-border roads As of 11 November 2019.

Roads in the Democratic Republic of the Congo
Geography of the Democratic Republic of the Congo
Transport in the Democratic Republic of the Congo
East African Community